Laurențiu Man was a Hungarian noble of Romanian origin who was in the service of Leopold I, Holy Roman Emperor. 

Laurențiu Man entered in the service of the Habsburgs which gradually imposed their rule on the Principality of Transylvania and Varat Eyalet in the late of the 17th century. As a reward for his loyalty to the Habsburgs, Laurențiu Man was ennobled by the Emperor Leopold I on December 7, 1699 in Vienna. The diploma was signed by the Emperor Leopold I, the chancellor of Transylvania Sámuel Kálnoky, and Andreas Szentkereszty (1662–1736). The Diploma of ennoblement was composed, written, and read by Matte Benignissime. Man Noble's house was located in Badatson, just  outside the capital of Krasna County, Szilágysomlyó. In addition to the aristocratic title of nobility for himself and his descendants, Laurențiu Man was also granted tax exemption for himself and his descendants in perpetuity. Laurențiu Man had one son Ilie (married to Nagy Viràgsi) and three grandsons: loan, Mihail, and Petru. Ioan Maniu (1833–1895) was one of his descendants.

References

Bibliography 
 Petri Mór: Szilágy vármegye monographiája III.: Szilágy vármegye községeinek története (A-K). [Budapest]: Szilágy vármegye közönsége. 1902. 41–47. o.
 Dionisie Stoica, Ioan P. Lazăr, "Schița monografică a Sălagiului", Șimleu Silvaniei, 1908.

External links 
  Badacson
  Diploma nobiliara a familiei Maniu

History of Transylvania (1683–1848)
Romanian Greek-Catholics
17th-century Austrian people
18th-century Austrian people
People from Sălaj County
Hungarian nobility